Valentin Grobauer (born 21 December 1994) is a German international motorcycle speedway rider.

Career
Grobauer won three bronze medals at the German U21 Championship in 2012, 2013 and 2015. He reached two European Junior Championship finals in 2013 and 2014.

In 2015, he reached both finals of the 2015 Team Speedway Junior World Championship and the 2015 Speedway Under-21 World Championship.

He represented Germany at the 2021 Speedway of Nations. In 2021, he signed for Birmingham Brummies for the SGB Championship 2021.

Major results

World team Championships
2021 Speedway of Nations - =8th

See also 
 Germany national speedway team

References 

1994 births
Living people
German speedway riders